Jean Paul King (December 1, 1904 – 1965) was an American announcer and actor.

Early years
Born in North Bend, Nebraska, on December 1, 1904, King was the son of Mr. and Mrs. E. B. King. After growing up in Tacoma, Washington, he attended Miami University in Oxford, Ohio, for two years before transferring to the University of Washington, from which he graduated in 1926. At UW, he was active in the University Players, glee club, and sports.  He was a member of the United States Navy Air Corps during World War II.

Career
King began acting with a stock theater company while he was a college student and went on to other theatrical productions until he became active in radio. Troupes with which he worked included the Henry Duffy players in Oakland.

Radio 
King was promoted from announcer on a radio drama in San Francisco to be the head announcer for NBC's West Coast network. From that position he went to work at KGW in Portland, KHQ in Spokane, and WLW in Cincinnati. He next became an NBC announcer in Chicago in August 1930.

On network radio, King was the leading man on Romance, Inc. and was the master of ceremonies for Saturday Night Party. Programs for which he was the announcer included Ziegfeld Follies of the Air, The Lanny Ross Show, Palmolive Beauty Box Theater, Myrt and Marge, Clara, Lu, and Em, The Shadow, Gang Busters, John's Other Wife, The Lamplighter, and The Voice of Experience.

King was named program director of radio station KDYL in Salt Lake City, Utah, on February 11, 1950. He also had a daily 30-minute program on that station.

Other professional activities
King was the narrator of Metro-Goldwyn-Mayer newsreels for two years. He also  narrated the Vitaphone films Mechanix Illustrated (no. 2) (1938) and Northern Lights (1936) and some Warner Bros. travelogues, beginning with Sweden (1936). He appeared on television in the episodes "Up Jumped the Devil" on The Dick Powell Show, "Who Killed April?" on Burke's Law (1964).

King was director of public relations for the Buckley-King company in Tacoma, and he was a writer who contributed articles to Radio Digest and other magazines.

Personal life 
On November 22, 1928, King married radio writer Mary Cogswell. They had a son.

References 

1904 births
20th-century American male actors
American male radio actors
American male television actors
American soap opera actors
Male actors from Nebraska
Radio and television announcers
University of Washington alumni
Year of death missing
People from Dodge County, Nebraska
United States Navy personnel of World War II